Aar Ya Paar (English: Now or never) is a 1997 Bollywood mystery crime thriller film produced and directed by Ketan Mehta. It stars Jackie Shroff, Deepa Sahi, Ritu Shivpuri, Kamal Sidhu and Paresh Rawal. The music is by Viju Shah. The movie is adapted from Agatha Christie's 1967 novel Endless Night  and James Hadley Chase's 1954 novel The Sucker Punch and was partly shot in Italy.

Story
Shekhar Khosla (Jackie Shroff) is an accounts executive, an alcoholic and a penniless playboy. He has an on-and-off romance with cabaret dancer Julie (Ritu Shivpuri).

One day his boss tells him to improve himself and hands him a multi-million rupee client, Veena Sanghvi (Kamal Sidhu) and asks him to maintain and strengthen the relationship with this client. Shekhar meets with Veena, seduces her and marries her, while having an affair with her personal secretary, Anu Chauhan (Deepa Sahi). When Veena finds out about this affair, she threatens to separate from him. Shekhar doesn't know about the will. Then Shekhar and Anu plan to kill her. They carry out their plan successfully, with the police concluding that her death was accidental. Shekhar finds out that Anu does not love him. To make matters worse, the police have evidence linking him to the death of his wife.

Cast
 Jackie Shroff as Shekhar Khosla
 Deepa Sahi as Anu Chauhan
 Ritu Shivpuri as Julie
 Kamal Sidhu as Veena Sanghvi
 Paresh Rawal as Inspector Khan
 Satish Shah as Jagdish
 Harish Patel as Gupta
 Ajit Vachani as Salim
 Mamik Singh as Anil (Anu's Boyfriend)
 Ravi Khanvilkar as Hargovind 
 Hunter Hearst Helmsley as Gigilo
 Doink the Clown as Joker
 Yokozuna as himself
 Bret Hart as himself
 Savio Vega as himself
 Chris Candido as himself
 Owen Hart as himself 
 Diesel as himself

Soundtrack
The music was composed by Viju Shah. The lyrics were penned by Indeevar, Maya Govind, Nitin Raikwar and Rani Malik. The soundtrack was released on Venus Records & Tapes Pvt. Ltd.

References

External links 
 

1990s Hindi-language films
1997 films
Films directed by Ketan Mehta
Films based on British novels
Indian crime thriller films
Films scored by Viju Shah
Hindi-language thriller films
1997 crime thriller films
Indian mystery thriller films
Films based on works by James Hadley Chase